Hurby "Luv Bug" Azor (born September 26, 1964), also known as Fingerprints, is a Haitian musician and hip-hop music producer. He is best known for discovering and producing the hip-hop trio Salt-N-Pepa and the rap duo Kid 'n Play.

Early life
Born in Port-de-Paix, Azor is Haitian.

Career
In late 1985, with the rise of hip-hop response records all the rage, Azor and the group Salt-N-Pepa (then known as Super Nature) recorded a response to Doug E. Fresh & The Get Fresh Crew's "The Show" called "The Show Stoppa". He also went on to produce Dana Dane, Sweet Tee, Kwamé and others.

Azor wrote and performed in Salt-N-Pepa's music video for "Push It", on keyboards and backup vocals, and also wrote the trio's song "Let's Talk About Sex", among others. In 1995, he co-wrote and produced Snow's single "Anything for You", which became the top-selling single in Jamaica that year.

Personal life
Azor also dated Salt from 1984 to 1989, during which time he conceived a baby with another woman.

Bibliography
Kurutz, Steve, "[ Hurby 'Luv Bug' Azor"], AllMusic.

References

Living people
American keyboardists
American record producers
Haitian emigrants to the United States
Hip hop record producers
1964 births